Urea transporter 1 is a protein that in humans is encoded by the SLC14A1 gene.

Function
The SLC14A1 codes for a urea transporter (UTB) that is expressed in erythrocytes and kidney. SLC14A2 and SLC14A1 constitute solute carrier family 14. UTB proteins constitute the Kidd antigen system.

References

Further reading

Solute carrier family